The Rio Grande Valley Magic were a professional indoor football team based in Hidalgo, Texas. The Magic were charter members of the Lone Star Football League (LSFL) in 2012, after playing as an expansion team in the Southern Indoor Football League (SIFL) in 2011. The Magic played their home games at the State Farm Arena.

History
In July 2010, team owner Chad Dittman announced that he would be bringing an expansion team of the Southern Indoor Football League (SIFL) to Rio Grande Valley. On August 19, 2010, Dittman announced the team's nickname would be the Magic and that the team would be coached by former NFL quarterback, John Fourcade.

Head coaches

Season-by-season results

Players

References

External links
 Official website
 Magic's 2011 stats

Defunct American football teams in Texas
Former Lone Star Football League teams
American football teams in Texas
Hidalgo County, Texas
American football teams established in 2010
American football teams disestablished in 2013
2010 establishments in Texas
2013 disestablishments in Texas